Museum of Contemporary Art (often abbreviated to MCA, MoCA or MOCA) may refer to:

Africa
 Museum of Contemporary Art (Tangier), Morocco, officially le Galerie d'Art Contemporain Mohamed Drissi

Asia

East Asia
 Museum of Contemporary Art Shanghai, mainland China
 Museum of Contemporary Art Taipei, Taiwan
 Museum of Contemporary Art Tokyo, Japan
 21st Century Museum of Contemporary Art, Kanazawa, Japan
 National Museum of Modern and Contemporary Art, Seoul, South Korea

Southeast Asia
 Museum of Contemporary Art (Bangkok), Thailand

West Asia
 Tehran Museum of Contemporary Art, Iran

Australia
 Museum of Contemporary Art Australia, Sydney
 Museum of Contemporary Art, Brisbane, 1987–1994

Europe
Museum of Contemporary Art, Belgrade, Serbia
Château de Montsoreau-Museum of Contemporary Art, Montsoreau, France
Museum of Contemporary Art of Rome, Italy
Museum of Contemporary Art, Zagreb, Croatia
Barcelona Museum of Contemporary Art, Barcelona, Spain
Museum of Contemporary Art, Vigo, Spain
National Museum of Contemporary Art (Romania), Bucharest, Romania
State Museum of Contemporary Art, Thessaloniki, Greece
Museum of Contemporary Art (Basel), Switzerland

North America

Canada
Montreal Museum of Contemporary Art
Museum of Contemporary Art Toronto Canada

Mexico
Museum of Contemporary Art (Aguascalientes), Aguascalientes, Mexico
Museum of Contemporary Art, Monterrey, Monterrey, Mexico

United States

Scottsdale Museum of Contemporary Art, Scottsdale, Arizona
Museum of Contemporary Art, Tucson, Arizona
Museum of Contemporary Art, Los Angeles, California
Museum of Contemporary Art San Diego, California
Museum of Contemporary Art Denver, Colorado
Museum of Contemporary Art Jacksonville, Florida
Museum of Contemporary Art, North Miami, Florida
Atlanta Contemporary Art Center, Atlanta, Georgia
Museum of Contemporary Art of Georgia, Atlanta, Georgia
Museum of Contemporary Art, Chicago, Illinois
Indianapolis Contemporary, Indianapolis, Indiana, formerly known as the Indianapolis Museum of Contemporary Art
Nerman Museum of Contemporary Art, Overland Park, Kansas
Massachusetts Museum of Contemporary Art, North Adams, Massachusetts
Museum of Contemporary Art Detroit, Michigan
Kemper Museum of Contemporary Art, Kansas City, Missouri
New Museum of Contemporary Art, New York, New York
Museum of Contemporary Art Cleveland, Ohio
Puerto Rico Museum of Contemporary Art, San Juan, Puerto Rico
Utah Museum of Contemporary Art, Salt Lake City, Utah
Virginia Museum of Contemporary Art, Virginia Beach, Virginia
Madison Museum of Contemporary Art, Madison, Wisconsin

South America
Museum of Contemporary Art of Rosario, Argentina
Museum of Contemporary Art, University of São Paulo, Brazil
Santiago Museum of Contemporary Art, Chile
Museum of Contemporary Art, Valdivia, Chile

See also
 List of contemporary art museums
 Contemporary Art Museum